Ocelis or Okelis was a port on the Red Sea, on the Arabian side near or at Bab al-Mandeb, the strait separating the Red Sea from the Gulf of Aden, part of the ancient reckoning of Arabia Felix. It is placed by Ptolemy a little to the north of the straits of the Red Sea. It belonged to the Elisari, and was subject to Cholebus. The place also sometimes appears as Acila or Akila (Ἀκίλα).

Ocelis belonged to the South Arabian kingdom of Saba-Himyar and is known as a stop on the maritime route from Egypt to India in the 1st centuries CE. In the 1st century, Periplus Maris Erythraei describes it as "not so much a port of trade as harbour, watering station, and the first place to put in for those sailing on".  Pliny the Elder reports their destination and describes Ocelis as the first stop on the sea journey from Egypt to India.

Ocelis was visited by traders coming over from the African side on rafts with aromatics, myrrh, ivory and tortoise shell, this being the only report of African navigation in this work.

The site of Ocelis is tentatively identified as at Khor Ghurayrah (Shaykh Sa'id) in Yemen.  During the 18th century, a port identified as Ocelis was known as Ziden.  It was described as a settlement of 500 houses with over a hundred ships in the anchorage.

References

Nobbe, C. F. A., ed. 1843–45. Claudii Ptolemaei Geographia. 3 vols. Lipsiae (Leipzig): Carolus Tauchnitus
Rackham, H. 1997–2001. Natural history: in ten volumes / Pliny ; with an English translation by H. Rackham, W. H. S. Jones, D. E. Eichholz. 10 vols. Loeb Classical Library. Cambridge, Mass.: Harvard University Press. Original edition, 1938–1963.

Ports and harbours of the Red Sea
Gulf of Aden
Populated places in ancient Arabia
Former populated places in Yemen
Ancient Greek geography of Arabia